Casey Marie Krueger (born August 23, 1990) is an American soccer player who currently plays as a defender for the Chicago Red Stars in National Women's Soccer League (NWSL). , she has over 30 caps for the United States women's national soccer team. She previously played for Avaldsnes IL in Norway's top-division league, Toppserien, and was named a Top XI player in the league.

Krueger was the fifth overall pick in the 2013 NWSL College Draft. She played collegiate soccer for the Florida State Seminoles.

Early life and education
Raised in the Chicago suburb of Naperville, Illinois by her parents Kerrwin and LeeShelle Short, Krueger attended Naperville Central High School, where she earned 4.0 honor roll recognition and was named an Illinois State Scholar. She was named PARADE All-American in 2008 and was twice named NSCAA/adidas Youth All-American in 2016 and 2017. Krueger helped Naperville to four Illinois state cup championships. In 2008, she was ranked a top-rated soccer recruit by the Chicago Sun-Times.

Krueger also ran track and won three state championships: two in the 800m run and one in the 400m dash. She was the first girl in Illinois history to win both runs Class AA track in the same year. She was named Chicago Tribune Toyota Athlete of the Week in May 2007.

Krueger played club soccer for the Chicago Magic. In 2009, she played for the Chicago Red Eleven of the USL W-League.

Florida State Seminoles, 2008–2012
Krueger attended Florida State University, where she played for the Florida State Seminoles women's soccer team, earned her bachelor's degree in Criminology with a minor in Sociology, and was a six-time member of the Dean's list. She also earned a master's degree in Sports Management.

During Krueger's freshman season, she was a starting player in 18 of the 23 games in which she played, scored two goals and provided six assists. Her six assists tied for third on the team and she ranked fifth in shots with 39. Krueger was one of two freshman to play in every game of the season. During the team's season opener against the University of Central Florida, Krueger scored a brace in the team's 5–0 win. Krueger played in all four games of the 2008 NCAA College Cup before being eliminated in the quarterfinals by Notre Dame.

As a sophomore in 2009, Krueger ranked sixth in assists in the Atlantic Coast Conference (ACC) despite missing the first six games of the season due to injury. She was a starting player in 7 of the 13 games she played. Her eighth career assist in just 13 ACC career games, made her Florida State's all-time leader for assists in ACC play. In 2010, Krueger finished her junior season ranked fourth on the team in assists with three. She ranked third on the team in goals with five. She was one of six players on the team to start every game during the regular season and during the NCAA College Cup. Krueger was named to the All-ACC Second Team.

In 2011, Krueger suffered a season-ending injury and red-shirted the season. During her final season with the Seminoles in 2012, Krueger transitioned into playing as an outside back and was a key part defensive line that set multiple school records, including shutouts (17), GAA (0.62) and fewest goals allowed in ACC play (4). She helped set a new NCAA record for the 13th longest streak of shutouts (9). Krueger started in all of the team's five games at the 2012 NCAA College Cup and notched two assists.  She was named to the NSCAA Southeast All-Region First Team, NSCAA Scholar All-American Second Team, NSCAA South Scholar All-Region First Team, Capital One/CoSIDA Academic All-District IV First Team, All-ACC Second Team. Krueger earned ACC Academic Honor Roll four times and was named to FSU's President's List twice. Her 11 career assists tied the school record in assists in ACC games.

Club career

Avaldsnes Football Club, 2015
Due to two season-ending injuries Krueger did not play in National Women's Soccer League during the league's initial two seasons despite being selected by the Boston Breakers as the fifth overall pick at the 2013 NWSL College Draft. Krueger played successfully for Avaldsnes IL during 2015 in the Norwegian Toppserien league and was honored as one of the Top 11 in Norwegian Toppserien league at the 2015 NISO Awards.

Chicago Red Stars, 2016–
Krueger was the fifth overall pick at the 2013 NWSL College Draft by the Boston Breakers but did not compete due during the 2013 season due to knee injury. She was acquired by the Chicago Red Stars  ahead of the 2014 season. Krueger suffered another season-ending injury before the 2014 season started.

After a successful stint in 2015 with Avaldsnes in Norway, Chicago Red Stars signed Krueger to compete in 2016 NWSL season.

Krueger was a starting defender in every match of the 2016 season and scored two goals. She was named to the league's Second XI team for the season.

In 2017, Krueger competed in 22 regular season games for the Red Stars. She was named to the NWSL Team of the Month for May, June and July. At the end of the season, she was named to the 2017 NWSL Best XI.

Krueger missed the first 10 games of the 2018 NWSL season after sustaining an ankle injury while playing for the national team in the 2018 SheBelieves Cup.

International career

Krueger has represented the United States on the senior national team as well as numerous youth national teams, including: under-16,
under-17,
under-20
and under-23. She competed with the United States under-20 women's national soccer team at the 2010 FIFA U-20 Women's World Cup in Germany.

Krueger received her first international call up to the senior team on October 6, 2016, by head coach Jill Ellis. She made her senior international debut on October 19, 2016, playing all 90 minutes against Switzerland women's national football team. Four days later, she played another 90 minutes against Switzerland in the same series of friendly matches.

In 2018, Krueger competed with the national team at the Tournament of Nations, where she played in eight matches, starting two. She played in two games during the 2018 CONCACAF Women's Championship and served one assist, helping the U.S. qualify for the 2019 FIFA Women's World Cup in France.

In May 2019, Krueger was surprisingly not included on the 23-player roster for the World Cup. Following the US World Cup win in August, Short was named to the roster for Victory Tour games against Portugal.

After Vlatko Andonovski was named head coach of the national team in October 2019, Krueger was named to his first training camp roster and first friendly matches against Sweden and Portugal. During the Sweden match on November 8, Krueger was a starting outside back and played for the full length of the 3–2 win. Six minutes into the game, her pass to Christen Press resulted in the game-opening goal.

In February 2020, Krueger was named to the roster for the 2020 SheBelieves Cup. During the U.S.' final match against Japan, Krueger was a substitute in the 61st minute and helped the team win 3–1.

On June 23, 2021, Krueger was included on the roster for the senior national team at the 2020 Tokyo Olympics.

Olympic appearances

Personal life
In May 2020, Krueger announced her engagement to long-term boyfriend and emergency medicine physician, Cody Krueger. They married in December 2020.

In December 2021, Krueger announced they were expecting a child in July 2022.

Honors
International
 CONCACAF Women's Championship: 2018
 SheBelieves Cup: 2018, 2020, 2021
 Olympic Bronze Medal: 2020

Club
 Toppserien Best XI: 2015
 NWSL Best XI: 2017, 2019
 NWSL Second XI: 2016
 NWSL Team of the Month: April 2019, June 2019

References

Further reading
 Murray, Caitlin (2019), The National Team: The Inside Story of the Women Who Changed Soccer, Abrams,  
 Wiggins, David (2018),  More Than a Game: A History of the African American Experience in Sport, Rowman & Littlefield,

External links

 US Soccer player profile
 
 Chicago Red Stars player profile
 Florida State player profile
 

1990 births
Living people
American women's soccer players
National Women's Soccer League players
Chicago Red Stars players
Women's association football defenders
Women's association football fullbacks
Florida State Seminoles women's soccer players
Soccer players from Illinois
Sportspeople from Naperville, Illinois
American expatriate sportspeople in Norway
American expatriate women's soccer players
Expatriate women's footballers in Norway
Toppserien players
United States women's international soccer players
Boston Breakers draft picks
United States women's under-20 international soccer players
African-American women's soccer players
Parade High School All-Americans (girls' soccer)
Footballers at the 2020 Summer Olympics
Olympic bronze medalists for the United States in soccer
Medalists at the 2020 Summer Olympics
21st-century African-American sportspeople
21st-century African-American women